Raising Hope is an American comedy television series created by Greg Garcia that premiered on Fox on September 21, 2010. Season 1 of the half-hour single-camera comedy aired on Tuesdays at 9 pm ET/PT. From the beginning of Season 2, Raising Hope moved to the new time slot of Tuesdays at 9:30 pm EP/PT. In Season 4, the show aired on Fridays at 9pm EST, until switching to 9:30pm on January 24, 2014. In March 2014, the show was cancelled.

, 88 episodes of Raising Hope have aired over four seasons.

Series overview

Episodes

Season 1 (2010–11)

Season 2 (2011–12)

Season 3 (2012–13)

Season 4 (2013–14)

References

External links 
 
 List of Raising Hope episodes at MSN TV
 List of Raising Hope episodes at The Futon Critic

Raising Hope